In the United States, the licensing of prehospital emergency medical providers (emergency medical technicians) (EMTs) and oversight of emergency medical services are governed at the state level. Each state is free to add or subtract levels as each state sees fit. Therefore, due to differing needs and system development paths, the levels, education requirements, and scope of practice of prehospital providers varies from state to state. Even though primary management and regulation of prehospital providers is at the state level, the federal government does have a model scope of practice including minimum skills for EMRs, EMTs, Advanced EMTs and Paramedics set through the National Highway Traffic Safety Administration (NHTSA).

While states are able to set their own additional requirements for state certification, a quasi-national certification body exists in the form of the National Registry of Emergency Medical Technicians (NREMT). The NREMT offers a national certification based on the NHTSA National Standard curriculum for the levels of EMR, EMT, Advanced EMT and Paramedic. Individual states are allowed to use NREMT certification as part of their certification process, but are not required to. As of 2011, 38 states use the NREMT examination for EMT certification and 45 states use the NREMT examination for Paramedic certification. These levels are denoted below using an asterisk (*). At present time, use of the NREMT examination for EMT-Intermediate 85 and 99 have not been included in this list.

Any provider between the levels of EMT and Paramedic is either a form of EMT-Intermediate or an Advanced EMT. The use of the terms "EMT-Intermediate/85" and "EMT-Intermediate/99" denotes use of the NHTSA EMT-Intermediate 1985 curriculum and the EMT-Intermediate 1999 curriculum respectively. In addition, not all states use the "EMT" prefix for all levels (e.g. Texas uses EMT-Paramedic and Licensed Paramedic). Finally, some states have levels that have partially been phased out. While no new certifications are provided at this level, providers can sometimes be grandfathered in provided they meet recertification requirements. Any level that has been completely phased out (i.e. not used for new or continuing providers) is not listed.

In some states there are also EMS-RN's which is a Registered Nurse trained in Pre-Hospital response.

In the list, each state's certification levels are provided from most basic at the top to most advanced at the bottom.

Alabama
Emergency Medical Responder (EMR)
Emergency Medical Technician (EMT)
Advanced Emergency Medical Technician (AEMT)
Emergency Medical Technician Intermediate (EMT-I)  **(Alabama is no longer certifying new EMT-Is (as of 2003). However, existing providers continue to be allowed to practice under this level of certification.)
Paramedic

Alaska
Emergency Trauma Technician (ETT) (Analogous to EMR) 
Emergency Medical Technician I (EMT-I) (Analogous to EMT via NREMT)
Emergency Medical Technician II (EMT-II) (Analogous to EMT-I/85)
Emergency Medical Technician III (EMT-III) (Analogous to AEMT/85)
Advanced Emergency Medical Technician (AEMT) (Established in 2015, follows and is certified via the NREMT testing process)
Mobile Intensive Care Paramedic (MICP) (Analogous to Paramedic via NREMT)

Arizona
EMT-Basic
EMT-Intermediate. Please note: Arizona is no longer certifying new EMT-Is. However, existing certifications continue to be allowed to practice under this level of certification.
EMT-Paramedic

Arkansas
Emergency Medical Responder (Not recognized by the Arkansas Department of Health, certification issued by local EMS Authorities and/or the Arkansas Fire Training Academy)
Emergency Medical Technician (EMT)
Advanced Emergency Medical Technician (AEMT)
Paramedic
Community Paramedic

California
Public Safety (Acts as EMR but is separate from the NREMT Certification for it. Is issued to Firefighters and Police Officers, usually after their P.O.S.T. Certification or their Fire Academy if the individual chooses not to pursue EMT. It is also separate from individual BLS and CPR Certifications. It is officially recognized by the California EMS Authority.)
Emergency Medical Technician (EMT) 
Advanced Emergency Medical Technician* (AEMT)
Paramedic
Critical Care Paramedic Endorsement for Paramedic Level* (It is offered in and recognized in some counties in California.)

Colorado
Emergency Medical Responder (EMR)
Emergency Medical Technician (EMT)
EMT- IV (Intravenous Therapy certification)
EMT-I
Advanced EMT (AEMT)
Paramedic
Critical Care Endorsement to Paramedic level certification
Colorado EMS Scope of Practice and Education Standard Comparison

Connecticut
Emergency Medical Responder (EMR) 
Emergency Medical Technician (EMT)
Advanced Emergency Medical Technician (AEMT)
Paramedic (Paramedics are Licensed professionals in Connecticut, whereas all other levels of EMS providers are certified and must participate in bi-annual continuing education following the current NREMT NCCP)

Delaware
First Responder
EMT-Basic
EMT-Paramedic

Florida
Emergency Medical Technician
Paramedic

Georgia
EMT
EMT-Intermediate/85 (no new licenses granted)
Cardiac Technician (no new licenses granted since 1998, similar to the NREMT-I/99)
Advanced-EMT
Paramedic (at least 504 classroom hours plus 320 clinical hours)
not

Hawaii
EMT (analogue to Advanced EMT)
Paramedi (also known as Mobile Intensive Care Technician or MICT)

Idaho
Emergency Medical Responder (EMR-2011)
Emergency Medical Technician (EMT-2011)
Advanced Emergency Medical Technician-85 (AEMT-85) (No new licenses granted)
Advanced Emergency Medical Technician-2011
Paramedic-2011

Illinois
FRD-First Responder Defibrillator
EMT-Basic
EMT-Intermediate/99
PHRN
EMT-Paramedic

Indiana
Emergency Medical Responder (EMR)
EMT (Emergency Medical Technician)
Advanced EMT
Paramedic*

Iowa
First Responder
EMT-Basic
EMT-Intermediate (analogous to EMT-Intermediate/85)
EMT-Advanced
EMT-Paramedic (analogous to EMT-Intermediate/99)
Paramedic Specialist (analogous to EMT-Paramedic)
Critical Care Paramedic Endorsement for Paramedic

Transition to new levels began January 2011, and finished in March 2015. 
Emergency Medical Responder (EMR)
Emergency Medical Technician (EMT)
Advanced Emergency Medical Technician (AEMT)
Paramedic
Critical Care Paramedic Endorsement for Paramedic level certification

Kansas
Emergency Medical Responder (EMR) - Formerly known as First Responder
Emergency Medical Technician (EMT)
Advanced Emergency Medical Technician (AEMT)
Paramedic (EMT-P)

Kentucky
CPR Drivers
Emergency Medical Responder (EMR) 
Emergency Medical Technician (EMT)
Advanced Emergency Medical Technician (AEMT)
Paramedic
Critical Care Paramedic Endorsement

Louisiana
EMR-Emergency Medical Responder
EMT-Emergency Medical Technician
AEMT-Advanced EMT
Paramedic (formerly EMT-P)

Maine
Emergency Medical Responder
Ambulance Attendant (no new licenses granted since 1996)
EMT
Advanced AEMT
EMT-Critical Care (no new licenses after 1998)
Paramedic

Maryland
Emergency Medical Responder (EMR)
Emergency Medical Technician-Basic (EMT-B)
Cardiac Rescue Technician-Intermediate* (CRT-I) (analogous to EMT – Intermediate/99)
Paramedic

Massachusetts
EMS First Responder (EFR)
EMT-Basic
EMT-Advanced 
EMT-Paramedic

Michigan
Emergency Medical Responder (EMR) (Also Medical First Responder)
Emergency Medical Technician (EMT) (formerly EMT - Basic)
Advanced Emergency Medical Technician (AEMT) (analogous to EMT-Intermediate/85)
Paramedic (formerly EMT-Paramedic)

Minnesota
Emergency Medical Responder
Emergency Medical Technician 
Paramedic
Community Paramedic
Registered Physician Assistant-EMT

Mississippi
Medical First Responder
EMT-Basic
EMT-Intermediate/99 (no new licenses granted at this level since 2002, however previous holders can continue to renew theirs)
AEMT
EMT-Paramedic

Missouri
EMT-Basic
Advanced EMT (AEMT)
EMT-Paramedic

Montana
(Endorsements are listed below each level, are optional and can be achieved in any order and combination.)
EMR-Emergency Medical Responder
Monitoring
EMT-Emergency Medical Technician
Airway
IV and IO administration
IV and IO maintenance
Medication
Advanced EMT
Paramedic
Critical Care Transport

Nebraska
Emergency Medical Responder
EMT-Basic
AEMT
EMT-Paramedic

Nevada
First Responder
EMT
Advanced EMT
Paramedic

New Hampshire
First Responder
EMT
Advanced EMT
EMT-Paramedic

New Jersey
Emergency Medical Technician (EMT)*
Mobile Intensive Care Paramedic (MICP)
Mobile Intensive Care Nurse (MICN)

New Mexico
EMS First Responder
EMT-Basic
EMT-Intermediate
EMT-Paramedic

New York
Certified First Responder
EMT-Basic
AEMT
AEMT-Intermediate (No new certifications granted, will now be replaced with AEMT)
AEMT-Critical Care (No new certifications granted)
AEMT-Paramedic

North Carolina
Emergency Medical Responder (EMR)
EMT
AEMT (Advanced EMT)
Paramedic

North Dakota
First Responder
Advanced First Aid Ambulance (no new licenses)
EMT (analogous to EMT-Basic; only used for providers under the age of 18 and providers requesting reciprocity from another state)
EMT-Basic
AEMT-Advanced EMT
EMT-Paramedic

Ohio
Emergency Medical Responder (EMR)
Emergency Medical Technician (EMT)
Advanced EMT (AEMT)
Paramedic

Oklahoma
Emergency Medical Responder (EMR)
EMT-Basic
EMT-Intermediate/85
EMT-Paramedic

Oregon
Emergency Medical Responder (EMR)(National Curriculum)
EMT (National Curriculum)
Advanced EMT (National Curriculum)
EMT Intermediate (State Curriculum)
Paramedic (National Curriculum) (requires a college degree)

Pennsylvania
Emergency Medical Services Vehicle Operator (EMSVO)
Emergency Medical Responder (EMR)
Emergency Medical Technician (EMT)
Advanced Emergency Medical Technician (AEMT)
Paramedic (P) 
Prehospital Registered Nurse (PHRN)
Prehospital Physician Extender (PHPE)
Prehospital Physician (PHP)
Medical Command Physician (MCP)
EMS-Instructor (EMS-I) (Additional endorsement)

Puerto Rico
EMT-Provisional License (Student)
EMT-Basic
EMT-Paramedic

Rhode Island
Emergency Medical Responder (EMR)
Emergency Medical Technician (EMT)
Advanced Emergency Medical Technician (AEMT)
Advanced Emergency Medical Technician Cardiac (AEMT-C) (State Specific)
Paramedic

South Carolina
Emergency Medical Responder 
EMT-Basic
EMT-Advanced
EMT-Paramedic

South Dakota
Emergency Medical Responder (EMR)
Emergency Medical Technician (EMT) 
Emergency Medical Technician - Intermediate/85 
Advanced Emergency Medical Technician (AEMT) 
Emergency Medical Technician - Intermediate/99 
Emergency Medical Technician - Paramedic

Tennessee
Emergency Medical Responder (EMR)
Emergency Medical Technician (EMT)
Advanced Emergency Medical Technician (AEMT)
Paramedic
Critical Care Paramedic (now officially endorsed by the state)

Texas
Emergency Care Attendant 
EMT
AEMT (formerly EMT-I)
Certified Paramedic
Licensed Paramedic (*Degree Requirement* Requires either an Associates Degree in EMS -OR- a Bachelors Degree in any field.)

Utah
Emergency Medical Responder (EMR) 
Emergency Medical Technician (EMT) 
Advanced Emergency Medical Technician (AEMT) 
Paramedic

Now have been phased out of the state of Utah:
EMT-Intermediate (state specific, phased out by Sept. 30 2013 however any EMT with this certification before Sept. 30 2013 could still be an intermediate and never did have to switch to advanced) 
EMT-Intermediate Advanced (analogous to EMT-Intermediate/99, phased out by Sept. 30, 2013 )

Vermont
Emergency Medical Responder (EMR)
Emergency Medical Technician (EMT)
Advanced Emergency Medical Technician (AEMT)
Paramedic
Advanced Paramedic (replaces state sponsored Critical Care Paramedic endorsement)

Virginia
Emergency Medical Responder (EMR)
Emergency Medical Technician (EMT)
Emergency Medical Technician Enhanced (EMT-E) (Transition from EMT-E to AEMT begins 2013 providers have up to 3 recertification cycles to transition to AEMT)
Advanced Emergency Medical Technician (AEMT)
EMT-Intermediate (As of January 1, 2020 no new certifications will be issued. Providers certified before 2020 may still practice under current EMT-I (I/99) certification level, and renew it indefinitely with completion of CME hours each cycle.) 
Paramedic

Washington
Emergency Medical Responder (EMR)
EMT
AEMT (Advanced EMT)
Paramedic

West Virginia
Emergency Medical Responder
EMT-Mining (specialty certification)
EMT-Basic
Advanced Care Technician
EMT-Paramedic
Mobile Critical Care Paramedic

Wisconsin
EMR (Emergency Medical Responder)
EMT (Emergency Medical Technician)
AEMT (Advanced Emergency Medical Technician)
EMT-Intermediate (Emergency Medical Technical Intermediate)
Paramedic
Critical Care Paramedic Endorsement
TEMS (Tactical Emergency Medical Service Endorsement) Primarily for SWAT teams

Wyoming
EMR (Emergency Medical Responder
EMT (Emergency Medical Technician
AEMT (Advanced Emergency Medical Technician
IEMT (Intermediate Emergency Medical Technician)
Paramedic

Wyoming has adopted the National Registry model with an addition of IEMT.  The IEMT has all of the skills of an AEMT with the addition of additional medications, endotracheal intubation, cardiac drugs and skills (manual defibrillator, epi 1:10000, etc.) chest darts and pain management.  National Registry is NOT required, and not accepted for licensing in Wyoming.

References

Emergency medical services in the United States
Medical lists